"Mujeres" is a song by the Dominican urban artist Mozart La Para featuring Justin Quiles, released on June 8, 2018 by the Latin division of the label Roc Nation. A remix version of the song was released on November 9, 2018 featuring Farruko, Jowel & Randy. The track became one of the first to gain an international audience of the Dominican urban movement, reaching countries such as Argentina or Spain.

Charts

Year-end charts

References 

2018 songs
Dominican Republic songs
Song articles with missing songwriters
Roc Nation singles
Reggaeton songs
Latin pop songs